Muzik for Insomniaks, Volume 1 and Volume 2 is a two-studio album series by Devo's co-founder and lead singer Mark Mothersbaugh. They were originally released in 1988, the same year as Devo's seventh studio album Total Devo, on the labels Enigma and Rykodisc. The albums consisted entirely of instrumentals that were performed in the style of easy listening muzak or new-age music similar to Devo's compilation album E-Z Listening Disc, released the previous year. Both of the albums were produced, written, arranged, programmed and performed by Mothersbaugh himself and engineered and mixed by former Devo keyboardist and guitarist Bob Casale. Mothersbaugh once described the albums as "M. C. Escher meets wallpaper."

Gábor Csupó co-creator of the animated television series Rugrats, had called Mothersbaugh and asked if he could use the music from Muzik for Insomniaks for Rugrats, however, Mothersbaugh proposed that he could compose new songs instead, and, after one meeting, Csupó agreed.

Muzik for Insomniaks is also the title of an album by Mothersbaugh released in Japan in 1985. This was released as part of the cassette magazine TRA after Mothersbaugh was given copies of the magazine by Hajime Tachibana, and asked if he could contribute. Only 10,000 copies were made of each TRA release, with Mothersbaugh's album also packaged with a deck of playing cards.

Track listing

Personnel
Credits are adapted from both of the album's liner notes which are identical.
Mark Mothersbaugh – Fairlight CMI Series IIx programming; Roland keyboards; arrangements
Production team
Mark Mothersbaugh – producer; art direction
Bob Casale – engineering; mixing
Patrick Pending – art direction
David Lomeli – art assistance
Jonathan Gelber – photography

References

External links

1988 albums
Enigma Records albums
Mark Mothersbaugh albums